Mir 3 may refer to:

 Mir EO-3, Mir Principle Expedition 3, to the Mir-1 space station
 Mir EP-3, Mir Visiting Expedition 3, to the Mir-1 space station
 Mir-3 microRNA precursor family
 The Legend of Mir 3, an MMORPG

See also
 Mir (disambiguation)